The Kildare Senior Hurling Championship is an annual hurling competition organised since 1888 by Kildare GAA among the top hurling clubs in County Kildare, Ireland. Up until 2012, the winner received the Seán Carey Cup but a new trophy in honour of the late Tony Carew (Coill Dubh) was donated by the Carew family in 2013.  As of 2022, after Naas won the 2021 All-Ireland Intermediate title, the county champions qualify to represent Kildare in the Leinster Senior Club Hurling Championship, the winner of which progresses to the All-Ireland Senior Club Hurling Championship.

Wins listed by club

Finals listed by year

References

External links
Official Kildare Hurling Website
Kildare on Hoganstand
Kildare Club GAA

 
Hurling competitions in Leinster
Kildare GAA club championships
Senior hurling county championships